Zacatepec is a Mexican football club:

Zacatepec may also refer to:

Languages
Zacatepec Chatino
Zacatepec Mixtec

Places
San Martín Zacatepec, Oaxaca
Santa María Zacatepec, Oaxaca
Santiago Zacatepec, Oaxaca
Zacatepec, Morelos, town and municipality in Morelos